This is a list of members of the Western Australian Legislative Assembly from 1965 to 1968:

Notes
 On 16 March 1965, the Liberal member for Dale, Gerald Wild, resigned to take up an appointment as Agent-General for Western Australia in London. Liberal candidate Cyril Rushton won the resulting by-election on 8 May 1965.
 On 30 June 1967, the Country Party member for Roe, Tom Hart, resigned. Country Party candidate Bill Young won the resulting by-election on 2 September 1967.
 On 6 July 1967, the Country Party member for Mount Marshall, George Cornell, died. Country Party candidate Ray McPharlin won the resulting by-election on 2 September 1967.

Members of Western Australian parliaments by term